The second season of Hannah Montana aired on Disney Channel from April 23, 2007 to October 12, 2008. Production of the season began in November 2006, and ended in September 2007. During this season, Miley and Lilly fight more, Oliver gets an alibi to hang out with Hannah Montana, and Miley grows closer to Oliver.

Production
Production on the second season began in Los Angeles, California in November 2006, and concluded in September 2007.

Casting

Moisés Arias becomes a regular cast member. In "My Best-Friend's Boyfriend", Larry David was approached by the producers about being on the show when he attended a Hannah Montana taping with his two daughters, who were fans of the show. He agreed, and appeared in the episode with his daughters, playing himself as a "frustrated restaurant patron". David's daughters are "huge fans" of Hannah Montana. Heather Locklear was also convinced to guest star after attending with her kids. Camryn Manheim and Brooke Shields also have made guest appearances because their kids enjoy the show. John D'Aquino and Madison Pettis from Cory in the House make guest appearances as their characters in a special crossover episode. The Jonas Brothers also guest star in an episode.

Dwayne "The Rock" Johnson appears in "Don't Stop 'Til You Get the Phone" as part of the Rock Block, in which he guest-starred in episodes of Hannah Montana, Cory in the House, and Wizards Of Waverly Place as a promotion for Disney's film The Game Plan.

Music
"I Want You to Want Me... to Go to Florida" features the ballad "Ready, Set, Don't Go" by Billy Ray Cyrus. It details his feelings concerning his daughter Miley's move to Los Angeles to star in Hannah Montana, while he stayed behind in Nashville. The episode also features the song "If Cupid Had a Heart", by Julie Griffin, and written by Gordon Pogoda. Mikayla (Selena Gomez), lip-syncs it in the episode. A soundtrack for the season featuring 10 songs sung by Miley Cyrus as Hannah Montana was released on June 26, 2007.

DVD releases
The second, Wish Gone Amiss Weekend DVD, which was released November 27, 2007, features the "When You Wish You Were the Star" episode and a Hannah Montana bonus "I Wish I May, I Wish I Might: A Guide to Making Wishes" hosted by Jason Earles. The Volume 4: One in a Million DVD which released January 29, 2008, includes four episodes of Hannah Montana. "Lilly's Mom Has Got It Goin' On", "Me and Mr. Jonas and Mr. Jonas and Mr. Jonas", "I Will Always Loathe You" and "That's What Friends Are For?" were included in the DVD. The DVD also features a That's So Raven episode "Run Raven Run", "Come Feud with Me" - the top 10 Disney Channel feuds, as well as the "One in a Million" and "True Friend" music videos. In Australia, following the release of the Complete First Season on DVD in November, Season 2: Part 1 and Season 2: Part 2 were released soon after. In part one, episodes 1-15 were included, while remaining episodes 16-29 were released in part 2. On the case, there are images from the episode "No Sugar, Sugar", but the episode was not released on the disc. A full season collection was released on November 25, 2009.

Episodes

Season 2 started with a week of 5 new episodes. The average ratings for the 5 new episodes were 3.7 million viewers.
Season 2 had several special episodes and marathons. The first special was "Achy Jakey Heart", in which Miley revealed her secret to Jake Ryan (Cody Linley). The second special, "Me and Mr. Jonas and Mr. Jonas and Mr. Jonas", which guest starred the Jonas Brothers, was aired with the premiere of High School Musical 2. Dwayne "The Rock" Johnson appeared in "Don't Stop 'Til You Get the Phone" as part of the Rock Block, which seen him guest-star in episodes of Hannah Montana and Cory in the House as a promotion for Disney's film The Game Plan. "(We're So Sorry) Uncle Earl" aired in a week-long Disney Channel event "Sweet Niblets, We're Related?". In 3 episodes this season, Hannah Montana wins an award.

References

General references

External links

 Hannah Montana broadcast schedule at zap2it.com
 

 
2007 American television seasons
2008 American television seasons